Russian Squash Federation ("Федерация сквоша России" in Russian) is the National Organisation for Squash in Russia.

External links
 Official site

Squash
National members of the World Squash Federation
Squash in Russia
1990 establishments in Russia
Sports organizations established in 1990